The Italian National Anti-Corruption Authority is an Italian independent administrative authority tasked with combating corruption in the country.

History
The ANAC was established by the Italian Anti-Corruption Law of 2012, which gave the Independent Commission for the Evaluation, Transparency and Integrity of Government (Commissione indipendente per la valutazione, la trasparenza e l'integrità delle amministrazioni pubbliche, CIVIT) National Anti-Corruption Authority function, in 2014, and incorporates the functions and personnel of the Authority for the Supervision of Public Contracts for Works, Services and Supplies (Autorità per la vigilanza sui contratti pubblici di lavori, servizi e forniture, AVCP) that was abolished by the decree law n. 90/2014, converted into law n. 114/2014.

Tasks and function
Its function is the prevention of corruption within the Italian public administration, in its various participants and subsidiaries, including through the implementation of increased transparency in all management aspects, as well as through the supervisory activities within the public contracts, in any sector of public administration that potentially could develop corruption phenomena, while avoiding aggravating the procedures with negative effects on citizens and businesses, orienting the behaviors and the activities of civil servants, with interventions in an advisory and regulatory capacity.

Structure
The Authority consists of five members, one of whom is president.

The general structure of ANAC in terms of its institutional mission has been divided into four strategic areas:
 Direction and planning (President)
 Support the institutional mission planning and control (General Secretary)
 Supervision
 Regulation

The ANAC established a special unit, EXPO 2015, tasked with controlling and supervising the fairness and transparency of the procedures related to implementation of the Expo 2015 event.

See also
Corruption in Italy
Politics of Italy

References

Corruption in Italy
Law enforcement agencies of Italy